Zoltan Kecskes (born  in Valea lui Mihai) is a Romanian born Hungarian male weightlifter, competing in the 69 kg category and representing Hungary at international competitions. He participated at the 1996 Summer Olympics in the 64 kg event. He competed at world championships, most recently at the 2003 World Weightlifting Championships.

He was caught for using Anabolic steroid.

Major results

References

External links
 

1974 births
Living people
Hungarian male weightlifters
Weightlifters at the 1996 Summer Olympics
Olympic weightlifters of Hungary
People from Valea lui Mihai
Hungarian sportspeople in doping cases
Doping cases in weightlifting